Hunting Hitler is a History Channel television series based on the premise that Adolf Hitler escaped from the Führerbunker in Berlin at the end of World War II. The show was conceived following the declassification of FBI documents exploring whether Hitler might have escaped his apparent fate in Berlin, where he is widely believed to have died in 1945. It explores how he might have escaped, where he might have gone, and whether he plotted a Fourth Reich. The series ran for three seasons between 2015 and 2018, followed by a two-hour special in 2020.

Series overview 
The show was hosted in Los Angeles by CIA veteran Bob Baer and war crimes investigator John Cencich. Utilizing a database of intelligence files from the FBI, CIA, MI6, and other international authorities, they look for information regarding the survival of Adolf Hitler or any of his right-hand men. The ground teams search for evidence supporting these leads. According to the show's creators, similar man-hunting techniques are employed as were used by the CIA to find Saddam Hussein and Osama bin Laden. Hitler's U-boats disembarked in Caleta de Los Loros es.

Investigative team
 Bob Baer — Former CIA Operative
 Dr. John Cencich — Former international war crimes investigator, professor, and criminologist
 Nada Bakos — Former terrorist targeting officer
 Tim Kennedy — U.S. Army Special Forces operator and former MMA fighter
 James Holland — WWII historian
 Mike Simpson — Medical doctor, airborne ranger, and special forces operator
 Gerrard Williams — Investigative journalist and historian
 Lenny DePaul — Former U.S. Marshals commander
 Steve Rambam — Private investigator and Nazi hunter

Episodes

Season 1 (2015)

Season 2 (2016–2017)

Season 3 (2017–2018)

Special (2020)

Reception 

The show has been criticized by various media outlets. Brian Lowry wrote for Variety, "Seriously, guys, what's next, 'Hitlernado?'" Lowry wrote for CNN that "in a year when 'fake news' received so much attention, History is willingly promoting bad historyfilled with unsubstantiated theories and speculation". Tom Conroy wrote for Media Life Magazine that "One gets the impression that [the series] will continue to spin its wheels for the duration. But even if it unearths evidence of Hitler's survival, there's no way the government would let that information out." Contrarily, the National Police Gazette, an American tabloid-style magazine and longtime supporter of the Hitler-escape narrative, wrote positively of the series' presentation.

Legacy
On May 17, 2018, popular podcast host Joe Rogan interviewed Tim Kennedy on his show; they discussed the series and its premise, including its focus on Nazi escape routes known as "Ratlines". Kennedy argued that the series is unlike the History Channel's pseudoscientific series Ancient Aliens and that Hitler indeed escaped to the Americas. Kennedy proclaimed, "The way history is written is wrong."

In 2019, series host Bob Baer stated that he actually agrees with the mainstream view that Hitler died in Berlin in April 1945, but that "there's no doubt" the dictator intended to flee to South America to carry out a Fourth Reich. The subsequent Hunting Hitler closing special focuses on the alleged Fourth Reich, at one point invoking a John F. Kennedy assassination conspiracy theory—one of a few fringe narratives Baer has voiced interest in.

In 2020, team member and author James Holland tweeted that "I was certainly interested in learning more about how Nazis escaped, but was very careful never to mention on film that I thought either Hitler or Bormann escaped. Because they didn't." In 2021, he further derided the series on his podcast, calling it "absolute nonsense". Historian Richard J. Evans dismisses all the survival stories of Hitler as mere "fantasies".

See also
Grey Wolf: The Escape of Adolf Hitler

References

External links

Transfer of Archives of Department 50 of the General Directorate of Investigations – National Archives of Chile (in Spanish)

2015 American television series debuts
History (American TV channel) original programming
2018 American television series endings